The 1977 Boise State Broncos football team represented Boise State University in the 1977 NCAA Division II football season. The Broncos competed in the Big Sky Conference and played their home games on campus at Bronco Stadium in Boise, Idaho.

This was the final season for BSU football in Division II; the Big Sky was in Division I for its other sports and joined the newly-created Division I-AA in 1978.

Because of their regular season ending on November 26, Boise State could not participate in the eight-team Division II playoffs, which began earlier that day. Big Sky runner-up  took the berth but suffered a 35-point shutout loss at home.

Schedule

Roster

References

External links
 Bronco Football Stats – 1977

Boise State
Boise State Broncos football seasons
Boise State Broncos football